Hippe is a surname. Notable people with the surname include:
 Ivar Hippe, currently a political consultant and former Editor-in-Chief of Økonomisk Rapport.
 Michelle Hippe, Voice actress known for dubbing Larry Koopa since Mario kart 8.
 Jon Mathias Hippe, younger brother of Ivar Hippe and current leader of Fafo.
 Johannes Hippe, he is the son of Jon and best known for his handball activities.